Scott McGilvray (January 20, 1966 – March 21, 2017) was an American educator and politician.

Born in Concord, New Hampshire, McGilvray went to Concord High School and Fitchburg State University. He received his bachelor's degree in human and health services and his teacher's certificate from Franklin Pierce University. McGilvray lived with his wife and family in Hooksett, New Hampshire. He taught social studies and was the football coach at Manchester Memorial High School in Manchester, New Hampshire. He was also the president of the New Hampshire National Education Association. He served in the New Hampshire Senate for the 16th district in 2017 until his death. McGilvray was a Democrat. McGilvray died in Massachusetts General Hospital in Boston, Massachusetts after a brief illness.

Notes

1966 births
2017 deaths
Politicians from Concord, New Hampshire
People from Hooksett, New Hampshire
Fitchburg State University alumni
Franklin Pierce University alumni
Educators from New Hampshire
Democratic Party New Hampshire state senators